Beruri is a municipality located in the Brazilian state of Amazonas. Its population was 20,093 (2020) and its area is 17,251 km².

The municipality contains 28.17% of the  Piagaçu-Purus Sustainable Development Reserve, established in 2003.
It contains about 6% of the Nascentes do Lago Jari National Park, an  protected area established in 2008.
It contain 57% of the  Igapó-Açu Sustainable Development Reserve, created in 2009.

References

Municipalities in Amazonas (Brazilian state)